A gigapixel image is a digital image bitmap composed of one billion (109) pixels (picture elements), 1000 times the information captured by a 1 megapixel digital camera. A square image of 31,623 pixels in width and height is one gigapixel. Current technology for creating such very high-resolution images usually involves either making digital image mosaics of many high-resolution digital photographs or using a film negative as large as 12" × 9" (30 cm × 23 cm) up to 18" × 9" (46 cm × 23 cm), which is then scanned with a high-end large-format film scanner with at least 3000 dpi resolution. Only a few cameras are capable of creating a gigapixel image in a single sweep of a scene, such as the Pan-STARRS PS1 and the Gigapxl Camera.

A gigamacro image is a gigapixel image which is a close-up or macro image.

Terapixel 
A terapixel image is an image composed of  one trillion (1012) pixels. Though currently rare, there have been a few instances such as the Microsoft Research Terapixel project for use on the Fulldome projection system, a composite of medical images by Aperio, and Google Earth's Landsat images viewable as a time-lapse are collectively considered over one terapixel.

In 2015 the 'Terabite', the world's first terapixel macro image, was released by GIGAmacro.

See also 
 Largest photographs in the world
 Powerwall - Computer technology for interactive gigapixel displays
 HD View - Microsoft's high resolution image viewer plug-in (Windows only - IE & Firefox)
 Gigapan - A Google/NASA/CMU spinout technology that includes a commercially available robotic imager, free stitcher, and web-based viewer
 Gigapxl Project
 Google Cultural Institute
 VR photography

References

External links

 EasyZoom - Website for quickly sharing gigapixel images without downloading
 Gigapixel.panoramas.com - Gigapixel Fan Engagement with tags at sporting events
 GigaLinc  - Immersive interaction with gigapixel images

 GigaPixel360 
 Gigapixel News
 Toledo 15 Gigapixels
 Technique for creating and viewing gigapixel macro images
 Gigapixel camera developed at Duke University 
 Image Stitching module for QuickPHOTO - software module for live stitching of microscope images in resolution up to several gigapixels
 GigaPixel.Cam - GigaPixel High Definition Photos

Digital photography
Photographic techniques
Panorama software
Photo stitching software